The mixed pairs figure skating at the 2007 Asian Winter Games was held on 2 and 3 February 2007 at the Changchun Wuhuan Gymnasium, China.

Schedule
All times are China Standard Time (UTC+08:00)

Results

 Uzbekistan was awarded bronze because of no three-medal sweep per country rule.

References

Results

External links
Schedule

Pairs